The swimming competitions at the 2021 Southeast Asian Games took place at Mỹ Đình Aquatics Center in Hanoi, Vietnam from 14 to 19 May 2022. It is one of four aquatic sports at the Games, along with diving, finswimming and canoeing.

Summary 
Singapore dominated the swimming events again, winning just over half of the gold medals at 21 out of 40, in addition to 11 and 12 silver and bronze medals respectively. In total, Singapore won 44 medals.

Host Vietnam came in second with a total of 25 medals at 11 gold medals, 11 silver medals and three bronze medals.

During the 4×100 m men freestyle relay event, both Singapore and Malaysia teams were disqualified by officials on technicalities shortly after winning gold and silver respectively. The Philippines team was also disqualified. Malaysia team coach Chris Martin said one of the Malaysian swimmers had entered the pool 0.12 s early during a changeover at the block. A Singapore swimmer was also reportedly left his block early. As a result, Vietnam, Indonesia and Thailand were awarded the gold, silver and bronze medals respectively.

A total of 10 SEA games records and 13 national records were broken.

Participating nations

Medal table

Medalists

Men

Women

Notes

References 

2021
Southeast Asian Games
2021 Southeast Asian Games events